Benesch is a surname, a Germanized version of Czech surname Beneš. Notable people with the surname include:

 Leonie Benesch, German actress
 Lynn Benesch, American actress
 Otto Benesch (1896–1964), Austrian historian
 Reinhold and Ruth Benesch, American biochemists
 Susan Benesch, American journalist and scholar

See also 
 Wilson Benesch, British audio equipment manufacturer

German-language surnames
Surnames of Czech origin